Coast to Coast is 2003 American-Canadian made-for-television drama film starring Richard Dreyfuss, Judy Davis, and Selma Blair, and directed by Paul Mazursky. It is based on the 1998 novel by Frederic Raphael, who also wrote film's screenplay.

Plot
Barnaby and Maxine Pierce are a middle-aged couple exploring the ups and downs of a marriage that has spun out of control. They have decided to divorce, but take one last cross country road trip from Connecticut to Los Angeles to attend the wedding of their son and give him their vintage Thunderbird as a gift. By reflecting on the life they've shared together, the couple begins to re-evaluate their marriage and discover the possibility of rekindling their relationship.

Cast
 Richard Dreyfuss.....Barnaby Pierce
 Judy Davis.....Maxine Pierce
 Selma Blair.....Stacey Pierce
 David Julian Hirsh.....Benjamin Pierce
 Kate Lynch.....Nessle Carroway
 Paul Mazursky.....Stanly Tarto
 Saul Rubinek.....Gary Pereira
 John Salley.....Clifford Wordsworth
 Maximilian Schell.....Casimir
 Fred Ward.....Hal Kressler

Reception
Today praised Richard Dreyfuss's performance, and described the film as "often funny, more often bittersweet. Familiar yet unpredictable. And refreshingly adult." The New York Times gave the film a positive review, calling it "very engaging".

Award nominations

References

External links
 
 

2003 television films
2003 films
2003 comedy-drama films
Films based on British novels
Showtime (TV network) films
Films directed by Paul Mazursky
Films scored by Bill Conti
2000s road comedy-drama films
American road comedy-drama films
American comedy-drama television films
2000s English-language films
2000s American films
English-language comedy-drama films